Vũ Cát Tường (born October 2, 1992) is a Vietnamese singer-songwriter, dancer, record producer, television judge and businesswoman who was a runner-up on the season 2 of The Voice of Vietnam. During the music career, she has received 6 nominations, won 2 Dedication Music Award and an inclusion on Forbes Vietnam 2018 30 Under 30 list, along with many other awards. She is the first Vietnamese artist have an album distributed by Universal Music Group, and VCT is also the first Vietnamese artist having a bilingual album recorded in one of the most famous record studios in the world - United Recordings.

Early life 
Tường was born on October 2, 1992, at Long Xuyên, An Giang Province, Vietnam. She studied at Ho Chi Minh City International University from 2010 to 2015 and received a bachelor's degree in Biomedical Engineering.

In 2012, Vũ Cát Tường received attention from The Voice executive producer, Phương Uyên, after performing her self-penned song, "Đông". Phương Uyên bought the song for a contestant of The Voice season 1 to perform, and had Tường playing the piano during the performance.

Life and career

2013: The Voice of Vietnam and career beginnings 
Vũ Cát Tường auditioned for The Voice of Vietnam season 2, singing "Đông" in her blind audition. All four coaches, Đàm Vĩnh Hưng, Mỹ Linh, Quốc Trung and Hồng Nhung turned her chair for her and Tường eventually chose to join team Đàm Vĩnh Hưng.

Vũ Cát Tường was pitted against fellow team Đàm Vĩnh Hưng member, Song Tú, who defeated her after singing "One Night Only". Although not chosen as the winner, she received three "steals" from other coaches and opted for Hồng Nhung. In the Knockout round, Vũ Cát Tường sang "Cám ơn tình yêu tôi" by Phương Uyên and advanced to the Live shows.

In the semi-final round, coach Hồng Nhung gave her all 100% of her point, which advanced her to the finale without any public vote counted. In the live finale broadcast on December 15, 2013, she was declared the second runner-up of the second season, behind team Đàm Vĩnh Hưng's Vũ Thảo My and team Mỹ Linh's Nguyễn Hoàng Tôn.

The Voice performances

2014–2016: Release MV, Album Vol.1, The Voice Kids 

In 2014, Vũ Cát Tường released her first products created by herself: "Yêu xa" is a love story of two lovers who must be temporarily apart. On pop background played by piano, the song has bright colors but still full of narrative feelings. This is the first single from Vũ Cát Tường's debut album, which marked her collaboration with musician Huy Tuấn, who is the music producer of the album. After the debut, this song received a lot of attention and reached the top of the music charts. Vũ Cát Tường also released this music video, the MV uses body language to create a poetic but daring multidimensional way of romance over geographical distances. At the end of 2014, Vũ Cát Tường released her first album Giải mã (Decode) (December 23). The songs in this album were all composed by Vũ Cát Tường with her true nostalgia and emotions about life. After that, Vũ Cát Tường also produced an MV for a song in the album Giải mã (Decode): "Anh và Anh".

In 2015, Vũ Cát Tường released two singles that were "Góc đa hình" for fans in the summer and single "Phai" with a new remix. These two years also marked the moments when the name Vũ Cát Tường "bombarded" the awards, the rankings. These are the recognition for Tường's creation, the music products regarded by the audience and highly appreciated by the experts.

After 1 gap year, Vũ Cát Tường returned, the first shot in 2016 was the release of the "Mơ" single – one of the hits that built Vũ Cát Tường's music career. "Mơ" is a soulful version of Soul & R&B music that had Vũ Cát Tường's hidden minds. The song still holds the style of Tường with the loosened melody and the romantic lyrics. The message that she wants to convey in this song is "the peaceful moments watching the moon on the terrace".

Vũ Cát Tường continued to release a new song "Don't you go". This is a song from the Neo Soul, R&B, Pop rock genre with the mix of Khắc Hưng. Don't you go has a jubilant melody full of life, different from Vũ Cát Tường's previous romantic rhythmic ballads before.

At the beginning of August, one of Vũ Cát Tường's songs named "Vết mưa" was accused of plagiarism from a Japanese pianist's music. This created a huge scandal and big arguments between different fan-bases as many anti-fans used this chance to voice their opinions online to bring her down. Vũ Cát Tường herself however, tayed out of all these fan-wars and staying level-headed despite all the harsh words and criticism sent her way from both the media and the anti-fans. Later on, Vũ Cát Tường contacted directly such Japanese artist and provided proof of her own demo for the song which was recorded much earlier than the Japanese pianist's song in question. With unquestionable evidence, the Japanese artist announced officially on her Facebook that Vũ Cát Tường's song "Vết mưa" is not related to her song ending the scandals and criticisms of the online community. It is a very clear, direct and straightforward, admirable solution of Tường.

Later in August, Vũ Cát Tường released a new single – "Góc ban công".

Beside releasing new products in the year, Vũ Cát Tường accepted to join The Voice Kids 2016 with the role of a trainer. Đào Nguyên Thụy Bình – representing the team Vũ Cát Tường entered the final round, won the position of the runner-up of The Voice Kids of Vietnam 2016. Immediately after The Voice Kids 2016 closed, Vũ Cát Tường released a new single called "Tôi" duet with Đào Nguyên Thụy Bình.

Single "Ngày hôm qua" – The last shot of the year and the opening of Vũ Cát Tường's new musical journey. The MV was released in early 2017. Her composition took Funk with R&B as the main theme, the harmony was mixed from the electronic sound played on acoustic background.

2017: Igniting and shining

On the occasion of Valentine's Day, Vũ Cát Tường officially released a new song titled "Em ơi". Especially, the song also has the contribution of Hakoota Dũng Hà, Tường's friend from The Voice season 1.

After releasing the audio version of the song "Cô gái ngày hôm qua" in March, Vũ Cát Tường continued to make the music video for this song. This is the soundtrack for the movie project "Cô gái đến từ hôm qua" adapted from the literary same-name work by writer Nguyễn Nhật Ánh.

At the end of July, Vũ Cát Tường produced a new music product called "Vài phút trước" collaborating with musician Nguyễn Thanh Bình to mix with a gentle and attractive R&B & Soul melody. Especially in new products, Tường firstly showed off her rapping skills, this was the first step Tường showed her personality in different music genres.

In mid-2017, Vũ Cát Tường confirmed the return of the "hot seat" of The Voice Kids which promised that it would be a more surprising season than before. Dương Ngọc Ánh – Vũ Cát Tường team has been the champion of The Voice Kids 2017 in the burst of thousands fans.

In parallel with the journey of The Voice Kids 2017, Vũ Cát Tường still had her own projects: releasing single "Buổi sáng bình thường" with cute and simple animated MV. The MV conveys the message: Love is not such a great thing to find, it is no need of luxury to be happy, The most meaningful things when being together come from the most normal things.

On October 14, Vũ Cát Tường organized the first "Birthday Concert" with about 5,000 attendants celebrating the 25th anniversary as well as affirming the musical path with her own marks.

After successful "Birthday Concert", Vũ Cát Tường continued to release the last single of 2017 – "Come Back Home", which was also a special song, which was performed in Birthday Concert before being released official. The song has the confidences of lovers and there have been mad moments, missed words hurting each other. The end of the year project 2017 project worked relentlessly of Tường is to release her first perfume brand, entitled "Come Back Home". This is the first "shot" in the collection of perfume called "The Notes" by Vũ Cát Tường, introduced to the public, with this new and spirited child, Tường had the opportunity to collaborate and work together with the world's leading scent-producing company: Firmenich.

2018–2019: A year of breakthrough and sublimation in creation

Together with the national atmosphere congratulating the Vietnam U23 team for achieving AFC runner-up trophy – Asia U23 Championship, Vũ Cát Tường presented to the whole team her own song titled "Chiến thắng". The song was written in 2 hours when Tường was on the plane touring.

In February, on the occasion of Valentine's Day, Vũ Cát Tường released the new song "You Are Mine", as a statement of Tường about love only with the sincerely cultivate feelings, without any boundaries of age, gender.

On April 24, Vũ Cát Tường attended the event to honor the top 30 most prominent under-30 people in Vietnam in 2018 by Forbes Vietnam. As one of the young faces honored in the field of Art – Creation, Vũ Cát Tường appeared and attracted a lot of attention from the guests.

In May, Vũ Cát Tường officially released her own fashion collection called "Be A Fool", including many easy-to-use items such as T-shirts, shirts, trousers, blazer blouses.

In June, Vũ Cát Tường became one of the three names chosen by UM channel to be the representative for this channel. UM Channel is a combination of Yeah1 Group and Universal Music Group, which is a TV channel in Vietnam specializing in domestic and foreign music, movie review, exclusive images of Vietnamese artists at international events.

After the success of the first perfume bottle in "The Notes" collection, Vũ Cát Tường continued to cooperate with Firmenich, the world's leading scent company to officially release the next perfume named "The Little Prince " in July.

On July 20, Vũ Cát Tường officially became the ambassador of Clavinova brand of Yamaha Music Vietnam.

One more year, Vũ Cát Tường confirmed to sit on the "hot seat" of The Voice Kids 2018, but this time Tường is no longer alone because she had a companion, trainer Soobin Hoàng Sơn, creating Bin – Tường team – one of the three trainers team of The Voice Kids 2018. The two young talents Xuân Phương and Anh Tuấn were excellent when they won two official tickets to enter the final round, gaining the title of runner-up of The Voice Kids 2018.

At the end of September, Vũ Cát Tường confirmed attending the Asia Song Festival 2018 as a Vietnamese artist invited to perform in Busan, South Korea on October 3. Asia Song Festival is a continental music event and has been held annually in South Korea since 2004.

On October 2, right on her birthday, Vũ Cát Tường officially released a new song "Leader" – marking a big change in Tường's music. Changing the music style and images is also a way that Vũ Cát Tường wants to assert that her art has a great creativity. MV Leader was invested in the image entirely in South Korea from A-Z, from image advice for the spirit of the song to the idea of making the MV are carefully taken responsibility by the Korean people.

On October 18, Vũ Cát Tường released her official Album Vol.2 "Stardom" with the concert to celebrate 5-year singer-songwriter and record producer career. Album Stardom has new materials such as Pop, R&B, Neo Soul, Blue, Hip hop, Rap, ... and crystallizes Tường's music style in the last 5 years. The whole images of the album were taken by the Korean ekip, and Ms. Lưu Thiên Hương was the main co-producer. The album marked Vũ Cát Tường in music was 5 years old and Vũ Cát Tường in life has turned 26. The 10 songs clearly reflect the path that Tường chose, and her view of work, love, original and freedom.

On November 10, Vũ Cát Tường's Stardom Concert took place at Lan Anh stadium with more than 3,000 attendants and friends and colleagues of Tường as guests. Vũ Cát Tường performed with a hologram effect and her 20 performances consisted of 10 previous songs and all 10 songs in the new album.

After the grand concert, Vũ Cát Tường was still full of energy and preparing for the album promotion abroad tour. Universal Music Group and Tường accompanied in the promotion campaign in Singapore, performing in the famous Fashion Show Council of Asean Fashion Designer in Malaysia.

Closing a meaningful 2018, Vũ Cát Tường released a Christmas commemorative song "Christmas Night". This song is a charity fundraiser for the end of the year, all the proceeds from selling this song's download on Tường's website will be donated to babies infected with HIV/AIDS at Mai Tâm Shelter.

On June 1, 2019: Vũ Cát Tường officially announced the "VCT Tour 2019". After that, Tường revealed the first place to host "VCT Tour 2019" is Hanoi with a concert titled "Dear Hanoi,".

2020: During the COVID-19 pandemic
On April 2, 2020, in the middle of the COVID-19 pandemic and salt-drought in the west of Vietnam has affected to the community, Vũ Cát Tường has announced about the Tomorrow Project - a single release and fund-raising to help the community. The project lasted for 2 weeks and collected the amount of 200 million VND (~US$8000).

On November 5, Vu Cat Tuong released the lead single of her new EP - "Hành Tinh Ánh Sáng" (Planet of light). Then on November 18, her first EP "Một Triệu Năm Ánh Sáng" (One Million Light Years) released in both digital and physical versions. Before the EP was released, it was on the No.1 of the most pre-ordered albums on Apple Music Vietnam and the physical merchandise combo has also sold out in 48 hours after on sale.

Personal life
Vũ Cát Tường came out as homosexual in a video uploaded on July 9, 2022.

Discography

Studio albums

Singles

Concerts and Tour

Concerts
 October 14, 2017: The 1st Birthday Concert in Ho Chi Minh City.
 November 10, 2018: Stardom Concert at Lan Anh Stadium, Ho Chi Minh City.

Tour
VCT Tour 2019.

 August 31, 2019: Dear Hanoi in Hanoi, Vietnam.
 December 15, 2019: Inner Me in Ho Chi Minh City, Vietnam.

Awards

References

External links

 Official Website
 Bandsintown
Spotify
Merchandise Store

21st-century Vietnamese women singers
Vietnamese pop singers
Vietnamese songwriters
1992 births
Living people
Vietnamese LGBT singers
Vietnamese LGBT songwriters
Lesbian singers
Lesbian songwriters